Hubert Carl "Bert" Lenne (2 August 1889 – 19 November 1973) was an Australian rules footballer who played with Fitzroy and St Kilda in the Victorian Football League (VFL).

Lenne played as a defender, most often at full-back, and spent 13 seasons with Fitzroy from his debut in 1910. A premiership player in 1913 and 1916, Lenne left Fitzroy after being omitted from their 1922 Grand Final side. He finished his career with two seasons at St Kilda.

In 1927, Lenne was appointed as captain / coach of the Benalla Football Club in the Ovens & Murray Football League.

References

External links

1889 births
St Kilda Football Club players
Fitzroy Football Club players
Fitzroy Football Club Premiership players
Australian rules footballers from Melbourne
1973 deaths
Two-time VFL/AFL Premiership players
People from St Kilda, Victoria